The armored rat (Hoplomys gymnurus) is a species of rodent in the family Echimyidae. It is monotypic within the genus Hoplomys. It is found in Latin America, from northern Honduras to northwest Ecuador. It possesses a range of spines on its back and sides of the body.

Description
They are born with soft fur, and the spines begin growing after the first month. The color of the armored rat range from black to reddish brown, and has a pure white underside. They are similar in appearance to Tome's spiny-rat, but the eyes of the armored rat are smaller and they have a longer snout. Its diet includes fruit, insects and green plant matter. The normal litter size is one to three.

Habitat
The armored rat is a nocturnal species, which occupies burrows.

Etymology

Phylogeny
Part of the infraorder Hystricognathi and family Echimyidae, armored rats are more closely related to porcupines, Guinea pigs, chinchillas, and common degus than to the common brown rat.

Within Echimyidae, the genus Hoplomys is the sister group to the genus Proechimys. In turn, these two taxa share evolutionary affinities with other Myocastorini genera: Callistomys (painted tree-rats) and Myocastor (coypus or nutrias) on the one hand, and Thrichomys on the other hand.

References
Specific

General

Woods, C. A. and C. W. Kilpatrick. 2005.  Hystricognathi. pp 1538–1600 in Mammal Species of the World a Taxonomic and Geographic Reference 3rd ed. D. E. Wilson and D. M. Reeder eds. Smithsonian Institution Press, Washington D.C.

External links

Echimyidae
Mammals of Colombia
Mammals of Ecuador
Mammals described in 1897
Taxa named by Oldfield Thomas
Rodents of Central America
Rodents of South America
Taxonomy articles created by Polbot